Tokirima is a valley and rural community, located west of Taumarunui and  south of Ohura, in the Ruapehu District and Manawatū-Whanganui region of New Zealand's North Island. State Highway 43 and Stratford–Ōkahukura railway line pass through the valley, and Ohura River passes nearby.

The name Tokirima translates as five (rima) adzes (Toki).

European settlers visited the area as early as 1902, and the first permanent European settlement began about 1940. Children were taught in settler homes until Tokirima School opened in 1910.

The Tokirima Memorial Hall was opened in 1924 and repainted in 2004. A roll of honour inside the hall commemorates the local men who served in the world wars: the nine men who died and 31 men who returned from World War I, and the two men who died 31 men who returned from World War II.

Education

The school spent all of 2015 searching for a sole-charge principal. Following coverage in the Waikato Times and Seven Sharp, it received 71 applications from across New Zealand, Canada, South Africa and Australia. The successful applicant admitted she had never heard of Tokirima before seeing news about the job.

References

Populated places in Manawatū-Whanganui
Ruapehu District